Zabrus morio is a species of ground beetle in the Pterostichinae subfamily that can be found in such Asian countries as Afghanistan, Armenia, Georgia, Iran, Kazakhstan, Pakistan, Syria, Turkmenistan, Turkey and Uzbekistan.

References

Beetles described in 1832
Beetles of Asia
Zabrus